Aubigné-Racan is a commune in the Sarthe department in the region of Pays de la Loire in north-western France.

Sights
In the surrounding countryside, one can find prehistoric standing stones, or dolmens ("dolmen de la Pierre" and "dolmen du Colombier").

Aubigné-Racan is also the site of the archeological excavation of Cherré, a Gallo-Roman complex of 20 hectares from the 1st to the 3rd centuries. The site was likely a rural centre of commercial and religious activity before the Roman conquest. Excavations in 1977 by C. Lambert and J. Rioufreyt discovered an ancient theatre, two temples, Roman thermae, a forum and an aqueduct.

The town has a Romanesque church from the 11th century.

People
Aubigné-Racan is the birthplace of the 17th century poet and dramatist Honorat de Bueil, seigneur de Racan. His birthplace, the Manoir de Champmarin, is still standing.

See also
Communes of the Sarthe department

References

Communes of Sarthe
Cenomani